Middle West Hotel, also known as Grand Opera House and Webb City Opera House, is a historic hotel building located at Webb City, Jasper County, Missouri.  It was built in 1883, and housed an opera house.  It was remodeled to its present form in 1902, and is a three-story, brick commercial building with brick corner pilasters and limestone trim.

It was listed on the National Register of Historic Places in 1982. It is located in the Downtown Webb City Historic District.

References

Individually listed contributing properties to historic districts on the National Register in Missouri
Hotel buildings on the National Register of Historic Places in Missouri
Hotel buildings completed in 1902
Buildings and structures in Joplin, Missouri
National Register of Historic Places in Jasper County, Missouri